Kureh Ajarpazi (also Romanized as Kūreh Ājarpazī) is a village in Margan Rural District, in the Central District of Hirmand County, Sistan and Baluchestan Province, Iran. At the 2006 census, its population was 54, in 11 families.

References 

Populated places in Hirmand County